Zhamao Township (Mandarin: 扎毛乡) is a township in Tongren County, Huangnan Tibetan Autonomous Prefecture, Qinghai, China. In 2010, Zhamao Township had a total population of 4,364: 2,205 males and 2,159 females: 1,228 aged under 14, 2,873 aged between 15 and 65 and 263 aged over 65.

References 

Township-level divisions of Qinghai
Huangnan Tibetan Autonomous Prefecture